Wild Bill Hickok Rides is a 1942 American Western film directed by Ray Enright and starring Constance Bennett, Bruce Cabot and Warren William. Bennett was paid $10,000 for her appearance, a significant drop from what she had recently been earning. Cabot is one of a number of actors to have played Wild Bill Hickok on screen.

Plot
After her Chicago gambling hall burns down in the Great Chicago Fire of 1871, Belle Andrews accepts an offer from an ambitious businessmen Harry Farrel to accompany him to Powder River, Montana to open a new casino. However, once there, she becomes disgusted by his criminal activities and joins forces with Wild Bill Hickok to thwart his plans.

Main cast
 Constance Bennett as Belle Andrews 
 Bruce Cabot as Wild Bill Hickok  
 Warren William as Harry Farrel 
 Betty Brewer as Jane 'Janey' Nolan  
 Walter Catlett as Sylvester W. Twigg  
 Ward Bond as Sheriff Edmunds  
 Howard Da Silva as Ringo - the Prosecutor 
 Frank Wilcox as Jim Martin - Ned's Lawyer  
 Faye Emerson as Peg - Chorus Girl  
 Lucia Carroll as Flora - Chorus Girl  
 Julie Bishop as Violet - Chorus Girl  
 Russell Simpson as Edward 'Ned' Nolan  
 J. Farrell MacDonald as Judge Henry Hathaway  
 Lillian Yarbo as Daisy - Belle's Maid 
 Cliff Clark as Vic Kersey  
 Trevor Bardette as Sam Bass  
 Elliott Sullivan as Bart Hanna 
 Dick Botiller as Sager 
 Ray Teal as Beadle
 Lillian Yarbo as Daisy, Belle's Maid

References

Bibliography
 Kellow, Brian. The Bennetts: An Acting Family. University Press of Kentucky, 2004.

External links

1942 films
American Western (genre) films
American historical films
1942 Western (genre) films
1940s historical films
1940s English-language films
Films directed by Ray Enright
Warner Bros. films
Films set in the 1870s
Films set in Chicago
Films set in Montana
Films scored by Heinz Roemheld
American black-and-white films
Cultural depictions of Wild Bill Hickok
1940s American films